Marble Valley Regional Transit District (MVRTD) operates a public transportation system in  Rutland County, Vermont called The Bus. The company currently has full bus service to Rutland and West Rutland, as well as limited daily bus service to Castleton, Fair Haven, Poultney and Killington. Limited weekday service is available to Ludlow and Proctor. It also provides weekday and Saturday service to Middlebury and Manchester, Vermont. The Bus also operates paratransit and Medicaid Transportation services for Rutland County.

The company attempted to expand service to the east to areas such as White River Junction, Vermont and Lebanon, New Hampshire in August 2009, following the acquisition and dissolution of the Vermont Transit brand by Greyhound.

There are 65 vehicles in MVRTD's fleet, most of which are wheelchair accessible. The company's main hub is housed in the Marble Valley Regional Transit Center, on the lower level of the West St parking garage in downtown Rutland. The Bus had an annual ridership of 475,900 in fiscal year 2010.

As of March 3, 2015, trip planning on Google Maps is available for all MVRTD bus routes.

Route list

City fixed
North
South
South Extension
West
Hospital

Out of town and commuter routes
Rutland-Killington Commuter (formerly the Diamond Express)
Proctor route
Rutland-Ludlow Connector (operates during the winter months)
Rutland-Middlebury Connector
Fair Haven-Rutland Connector
Manchester-Rutland Connector

Fare schedule
(information is current as of August 14, 2014)

Children ages 6 and under ride free with a paying adult. Deviations of up to 1/4 mile (0.4 km) can be made on out of town routes. There is a half-fare discount schedule for seniors, the disabled and Medicare cardholders on most routes.

$0.50 for City Fixed routes ($0.25 for seniors/disabled)
$2.00 for out of town routes and the Diamond Express, except Proctor ($1.00 for seniors/disabled)
$1.00 for Proctor route ($0.50 for seniors/disabled)
$15 for City Fixed monthly pass ($7.50 for seniors/disabled)
$9 for Proctor 10-ride pass ($4.50 for seniors/disabled)
$18 for 10-ride pass on out of town routes except Proctor ($9 for seniors/disabled)
$30 for Proctor monthly pass ($15 for seniors/disabled)
$60 for Middlebury Connector monthly pass ($30 for seniors/disabled)
$150 for Rutland/Killington winter season pass on Diamond Express

References

External links
 MVRTD website (archived)

Bus transportation in Vermont